Tobi 11 - Coptic Calendar - Tobi 13

The twelfth day of the Coptic month of Tobi, the fifth month of the Coptic year. On a common year, this day corresponds to January 7, of the Julian Calendar, and January 20, of the Gregorian Calendar. This day falls in the Coptic Season of Shemu, the season of the Harvest. This is the second day of the celebrations of the Feast of the Theophany.

Commemorations

Feasts 

 Second Day of the Feast of the Theophany
 Monthly commemoration of the Archangel Michael

Saints 

 The martyrdom of Saint Theodore the Oriental 
 The martyrdom of Saint Anatolius

References 

Days of the Coptic calendar